Cassius Clay (soon Muhammad Ali) fought a ten-round boxing match with Don Warner in Miami on February 28,1962. Clay won the fight through a technical knockout after the referee stopped the fight in the fourth round. Warner would later serve as a sparring partner for Joe Frazier.

References

Warner
1961 in boxing
February 1962 sports events in the United States